"Satin Only" is a song by Ammonia, released as the first single from their upcoming second studio album Eleventh Avenue in 1996. Released ahead of the album, the song was not a big success and was unbeknownst to most that it was on the album, as it appeared as a hidden track at the end of the album joined to song "Pipe Dream".

Track listings
"Satin Only" – 3:34
"Aniseed" – 3:33
"Dogwater" – 2:25

1996 singles
Ammonia (band) songs
1996 songs
Murmur (record label) singles